Thomas Sonntag (28 August 1858 – 9 October 1938) was a New Zealand cricketer. He played one first-class match for Otago in 1883/84.

See also
 List of Otago representative cricketers

References

External links
 

1858 births
1938 deaths
New Zealand cricketers
Otago cricketers
Cricketers from Melbourne